Anthony Msonter Shimaga (born 24 August 1997) is a Nigerian footballer who plays as a midfielder for Portuguese club Feirense.

Career statistics

Club

Notes

International

References

1997 births
Living people
Nigerian footballers
Nigeria international footballers
Association football midfielders
Nigeria Professional Football League players
BCC Lions F.C. players
Lobi Stars F.C. players
Ifeanyi Ubah F.C. players
Rangers International F.C. players
C.D. Feirense players
Nigerian expatriate footballers
Nigerian expatriate sportspeople in Portugal
Expatriate footballers in Portugal
People from Gboko